Basham may refer to:
 Basham (surname)
 Basham, Alabama, an unincorporated community in the United States
 Basham, Virginia, an unincorporated community in the United States
 The Basham Brothers, American wrestling tag team of Doug and Danny Basham

See also
Besham
Barham (disambiguation)